Joaquín Rocha Herrera (born August 16, 1944, in Mexico City) is a Mexican former Olympic heavyweight boxer.

Amateur career
Rocha was a 1968 Olympic boxing bronze medalist in the heavyweight division at Mexico City in 1968.

1968 Olympic results
Below is the record of Joaquin Rocha, a Mexican heavyweight boxer who competed at the 1968 Mexico City Olympics:

 Round of 16: defeated Adonis Ray (Ghana) by decision, 4-1
 Quarterfinal: defeated Rudi Lubbers (Netherlands) by decision, 3-2
 Semifinal: lost to Jonas Chpulis (Soviet Union) referee stopped contest (was awarded bronze medal)

References
 databaseOlympics
 Olympic Results

Boxers from Mexico City
Heavyweight boxers
Boxers at the 1968 Summer Olympics
Olympic boxers of Mexico
Olympic bronze medalists for Mexico
1944 births
Living people
Olympic medalists in boxing
Mexican male boxers
Medalists at the 1968 Summer Olympics
Boxers at the 1971 Pan American Games
Pan American Games medalists in boxing
Pan American Games silver medalists for Mexico
Medalists at the 1971 Pan American Games